Tetanolita is a genus of litter moths of the family Erebidae. The genus was erected by Augustus Radcliffe Grote in 1873.

Species
Tetanolita borgesalis (Walker, 1859) Brazil (Rio de Janeiro)
Tetanolita floridana J. B. Smith, 1895 Florida – Florida tetanolita moth
Tetanolita hermes Schaus, 1916 Paraguay
Tetanolita mutatalis (Möschler, 1890) Puerto Rico, Bahamas
Tetanolita mynesalis (Walker, 1859) Alabama, Texas – smoky tetanolita moth
Tetanolita negalis Barnes & McDunnough, 1912 Arizona
Tetanolita nisonalis (Walker, [1859]) Venezuela
Tetanolita nolualis (Schaus, 1906) Mexico
Tetanolita palligera (J. B. Smith, 1884) California

References

Herminiinae
Moth genera